Lim Chiow Chuan (born 24 February 1966) is a Malaysian field hockey player. He competed at the 1992 Summer Olympics and the 1996 Summer Olympics.

References

External links

1966 births
Living people
Malaysian sportspeople of Chinese descent
Malaysian male field hockey players
Olympic field hockey players of Malaysia
Field hockey players at the 1992 Summer Olympics
Field hockey players at the 1996 Summer Olympics
Place of birth missing (living people)
Asian Games medalists in field hockey
Asian Games bronze medalists for Malaysia
Medalists at the 1990 Asian Games
Field hockey players at the 1990 Asian Games